Presidential elections were held in Kiribati on 12 May 1987. The result was a victory for incumbent Ieremia Tabai, who won 50.1% of the vote. Voter turnout was 78.3%.

Results

References

Kiribati
Presidential
Presidential elections in Kiribati
Non-partisan elections
Election and referendum articles with incomplete results